Coleotechnites edulicola is a moth of the family Gelechiidae. It is found in North America, where it has been recorded from New Mexico and southern Utah and possibly Colorado.

The wingspan is about 10 mm. The forewings are mottled dark brown and white. The hindwings are grey. Adults are on wing in June and July in one generation per year.

The larvae feed on Pinus ponderosa and Pinus edulis. Young larvae bore into green needles, feed within them, and overwinter there as second and third instar larvae.

References

External links
Two New Pine Feeding species of Coleotechnites

Coleotechnites
Moths described in 1978